Nesim Özgür or Nesim Neshadov (born 8 June 1973) is a former Turkish-Bulgarian footballer. He played for the Süper Lig clubs İstanbulspor, Trabzonspor, Malatyaspor and Bursaspor. He also played for Litex Lovech and Lokomotiv Plovdiv in his birth country Bulgaria.

References 
 Player profile at futbolmerkezi.com

1973 births
Living people
Bulgarian footballers
Bulgaria international footballers
Turkish footballers
İstanbulspor footballers
Malatyaspor footballers
Trabzonspor footballers
PFC Litex Lovech players
PFC Lokomotiv Plovdiv players
Bursaspor footballers
First Professional Football League (Bulgaria) players
Bulgarian Turks in Turkey
Bulgarian emigrants to Turkey
People from Kardzhali

Association football defenders